Luxury Liner is the fourth studio album by American country music artist Emmylou Harris, released in 1976. The album was Harris' second successive #1 country album on the Billboard charts, although, unlike the preceding Elite Hotel, there were no #1 hits from this album. The highest-charting singles were the #6 Chuck Berry cover "(You Never Can Tell) C'est la Vie" and the #8 "Making Believe" (originally a hit for Kitty Wells).  However, the album may be better known for including the first cover version of Townes Van Zandt's 1972 song "Pancho and Lefty", which subsequently became Van Zandt's best-known composition.

Track listing

Personnel
Credits adapted from the liner notes of Luxury Liner.
Brian Ahern - acoustic guitar, electric guitar, finger-style acoustic guitar
Mike Auldridge - dobro
Dianne Brooks - backing vocals
James Burton - electric guitar
Rodney Crowell - acoustic guitar, electric guitar, high-strung guitar, backing vocals
Rick Cunha - acoustic guitar
Hank DeVito - pedal steel
Emory Gordy Jr. - bass
Glen Hardin - piano, electric piano, string arrangements
Emmylou Harris - vocals, acoustic guitar
Nicolette Larson - duet vocals
Albert Lee - acoustic guitar, electric guitar, mandolin, backing vocals
Dolly Parton - backing vocals
Herb Pedersen - backing vocals
Mickey Raphael - harmonica, bass harmonica
Ricky Skaggs - fiddle, mandolin
Fayssoux Starling - backing vocals
John Ware - drums

Technical
Brian Ahern - production, engineering
Donivan Cowart - engineering
Bradley Hartman - engineering
Stuart Taylor - engineering
Miles Wilkinson - engineering

Charts

Weekly charts

Year-end charts

References

Emmylou Harris albums
1977 albums
Albums produced by Brian Ahern (producer)
Warner Records albums